Zagórze Śląskie  is a village in the administrative district of Gmina Walim, within Wałbrzych County, Lower Silesian Voivodeship, in south-western Poland.

History
Zagórze Śląskie arouse at the foot of Grodno Castle (Kynsburg) built in the late 13th century by Duke Bolko I the Strict as a fortress near the border with the Kingdom of Bohemia. After it had fallen to the Bohemian crown in 1368 it was held as a fief by various possessors, among them the Counts of Hoberg at Książ until 1567 and Prince Michael the Brave of Wallachia.

Sights

 Grodno Castle
 Dam on Lubachowskie Lake
 Church, mentioned in 1376, existing from approx 1550

Walking routes
 Green: "Szlak Zamków Piastowskich" to Grodziec Castle
 Yellow: PKP Wałbrzych Główny – Nowy Dwór Castle – Jedlina-Zdrój – Niedźwiedzica – Zagórze Śląskie – Zamek Grodno – Bystrzyca Górna – Świdnica – Ślęża – Wieżyca – PKP w Sobótce – Wrocław
 Blue: European walking route E3 Spain – Bulgaria

References

External links
Home Page of Grodno Castle (in Polish)

Villages in Wałbrzych County